is one of the 10 wards in Sapporo, Hokkaidō, Japan. It is directly translated as "east ward", and is neighboured to Kita-ku, Chūō-ku, Shiroishi-ku, Ebetsu, Tōbetsu.

Overview 
According to the 2008 registry of residential addresses, 254,360 people lived in Higashi-ku. It is 57.13 km² in area, and a number of rivers are located in the ward including the Toyohira River.

The ward has a mascot character, Tappy, which was designed to be an onion-themed fairy; it was named in 1993, and is a portmanteau of "Tamanegi" (meaning onion in Japanese) and "happy". The onion is a vegetable raised in Higashi-ku, and therefore Tappy is associated with onions.

History 
Originally, at the place where Higashi-ku is, Naebo Village and Okadama Village were established by pioneers in 1870. Sapporo Village was established in 1871, and Kariki Village was established in 1873. In 1902, Naebo Village, Okadama Village, and Kariki Village were merged into Sapporo Village, which covered nearly the same extent as the current Higashi-ku.

In 1955, Sapporo Village was merged into Sapporo City. In 1972, Sapporo was listed as one of the cities designated by government ordinance, which enabled Higashi-ku to be established. In 1988, the Tōhō line of the Sapporo Municipal Subway was laid, and subway stations were placed in Higashi-ku.

Economy
The headquarters of Hokkaido Air System is located on the property of Okadama Airport in Okadama-chō. Previously the airline was headquartered in the New Chitose Airport terminal in Chitose.

In April 2004 Air Nippon Network was headquartered in Higashi-ku.

Education

Universities
 Sapporo Ōtani University
 Tenshi College
Sapporo University of Health Sciences

junior college
 Sapporo Otani Junior College

Secondary school
 Sapporo Kaisei Secondary school

High schools

Public
 Hokkaido Sapporo Okadama High School
 Hokkaido Sapporo Toryo High School
 Hokkaido Sapporo Toho High School
 Hokkaido Sapporo Kaisei High School

Private
 Sapporo Otani High School
 Sapporo Kosei High School
 Sapporo Hokuto High School

Transportation

Air
 Okadama Airport - an airport located in Okadama.

Rail
 Sapporo Municipal Subway
 Tōhō Line: Sakaemachi - Shindō-Higashi - Motomachi - Kanjō-Dōri-Higashi - Higashi-Kuyakusho-Mae - Kita-Jūsan-Jō-Higashi

Road
 Sasson Expressway: Kariki IC - Fushiko IC - Sapporo-Kita IC
 Route 5

Points of interest 
 Moerenuma park - a park designed by Isamu Noguchi, an American-Japanese artist. 
 Sapporo Satoland - one of the venues of the Sapporo Snow Festival.
 Sapporo Beer Museum - the only beer museum in Japan.
 Sapporo Community Dome - a sports and event venue, which is also known as its nickname "Tsu-Dome".
 Ario - a large shopping mall.

Sources

External links 
 Youkoso Higashiku - Official homepage of Higashi-ku 

 
Wards of Sapporo